The following is a list of notable alumni, faculty and affiliates of Queen's University at Kingston in Kingston, Ontario, Canada.

Notable Queen's alumni

Academic leaders
John Hall Archer – first president of the University of Regina
Herbert Basser – theologian, Harvard Starr Fellow
David Card – economist, winner of John Bates Clark Medal
George Ramsay Cook – Canadian historian
William Thomson Newnham – first president of Seneca College, 1967–1984
Frits Pannekoek (PhD 1974) – president of Athabasca University
Shirley M. Tilghman (BSc 1968) – president of Princeton University, member of the board of directors of Google
Alfred Fitzpatrick – founder of Frontier College
David Siderovski – Professor and Chair of Pharmacology & Neuroscience at University of North Texas Health Science Center (winner of ASPET John J. Abel Award)
Robert Sutherland – first person of colour to graduate from a Canadian university, and the first black lawyer in British North America.
Vijay Bhargava – researcher, co-author/co-editor of Digital Communications by Satellite (1981), Cooperative Cellular Wireless Communications (2011), Reed Solomon Codes and their Applications (1994), Communications, Information and Network Security (2003)and Cognitive Wireless Communication Networks (2007).

Actors, film, and media
Scott Anderson – CanWest MediaWorks senior vice-president, content; former editor-in-chief of the Ottawa Citizen
Dean Armstrong – actor
Ashleigh Banfield – CNN news anchor
Rachel Blanchard – actress
Kristian Bruun – actor
Greg Bryk – actor
Nicholas Campbell – actor
Tom Cavanagh – actor, played title character in sitcom Ed
Wendy Crewson – actress
Brendan Connor – television broadcaster, Al Jazeera International
Chris Cuthbert – TSN sportscaster
Lyse Doucet - BBC's Chief International Correspondent 
Lisa Eichhorn – actress
Sally Gifford – host on CBC's national kids' show, The X
Lorne Greene (BA'37, LLD'71) – actor
Amy Lalonde – actress, also played an actress who went to Queen's Business School in Wild Roses
Anna Olson – chef and television presenter
Italia Ricci – actress
Michelle MacLaren – TV series director
Molly McGlynn – film and television director and screenwriter
Shelagh Rogers – CBC broadcaster
Ted Simonett – actor
Jeffrey Simpson – political columnist for The Globe and Mail
Rod Smith – TSN sportscaster
John Stackhouse – former Editor, The Globe and Mail
Katie Uhlmann – actress and producer
Ali Velshi – former Report on Business Television and current CNN business reporter
Nancy Wilson – CBC journalist
Gema Zamprogna – actor
Linda Liao (廖語晴) – singer/actress
Sarita Choudhury – actress
Rachel Skarsten – actress
Julie Stewart-Binks – sports broadcaster, ESPN
Vanessa Morgan – actress
Ashleigh Rains – actress and producer
Evanka Osmak – SportsNet broadcaster

Business people
Alfred Bader (B.Sc. 1945, B.A. 1946, M.Sc. 1947) – founder of Sigma-Aldrich Corporation, and donor of 15th century Herstmonceux Castle
Geoffrey Ballard – founder of Ballard Power Systems
Robert Buchan – founder and former president and CEO of Kinross Gold
Derek Burney (B.A. 1962, M.A. 1964) – former president and CEO of Bell Canada, current member of the board of directors of CanWest Global Communications, Quebecor World Inc. and Shell Canada
Donald J. Carty – former chairman and CEO of AMR Corporation, the parent company of American Airlines
Gururaj Deshpande – founder of Sycamore Networks
David A. Dodge – former governor of the Bank of Canada, and chancellor of Queen's, effective July 1, 2008
Frances Donald – youngest chief economist for a major financial services firm in Canada (Manulife)
Elon Musk –  founder, CEO, and Chief Engineer at SpaceX; early stage investor, CEO, and Product Architect of Tesla, Inc. (left after 2 years).
Kimbal Musk – South African restaurateur, chef, and entrepreneur
Don Drummond (MA, LLD) – former senior vice-president and Chief Economist of TD Bank Financial Group and Donald Matthews Faculty Fellowship on Global Public Policy 
Mel Goodes – former chairman and CEO of the Warner-Lambert Company
Stephen K. Gunn – CEO and co-founder of Sleep Country Canada
F. C. Kohli – former CEO of Tata Consultancy Services (TCS)
Leonard Lee (B.A. 1963) – founder of Lee Valley Tools
Michael MacMillan – chairman and co-founder of Alliance Atlantis
Earle McLaughlin – former president and CEO of the Royal Bank of Canada
Seaton McLean – co-founder of Atlantis Films (now Alliance Atlantis)
Alexander C. Monteith – senior vice-president of the Westinghouse Electric Corporation and recipient of the IEEE Edison Medal
Nik Nanos – founder, Nanos Research
Gord Nixon (BComm 1979) – president and CEO of the Royal Bank of Canada
Douglas Peters (BComm 1963) – banker, economist and politician
Stephen Poloz – Governor of the Bank of Canada
Stephen Quinn – senior vice president, Wal-Mart Inc, Bentonville, Arkansas
David Radler (MBA 1967) – former president of Ravelston Corporation (which owned Argus Corporation which controlled Hollinger International), cooperating with the prosecution in the Conrad Black racketeering case
Michele Romanow (BScEng 2007, MBA 2008) – cast member on Dragons' Den, co-founder of Clearbanc
Michael Serbinis (B.S.) – president and CEO of Kobo Inc.
Chris Viehbacher – CEO of Sanofi
 Mark Wiseman – president and CEO of Canada Pension Plan Investment Board

Literature and the arts

Jill Barber – singer-songwriter
Matthew Barber – singer-songwriter
Janet Cardiff – artist
Lina Chartrand (B.A.) – writer
George Elliott Clarke (Ph.D. 1993) – writer and academic
Dawn Dumont – author
Jim Cuddy – lead singer of Blue Rodeo
Kalli Dakos – children's poet and teacher
Robertson Davies, CC – author and playwright
Gord Downie – lead singer of band The Tragically Hip
Priscilla Galloway – author
Marc Garniss – guitarist I Hate Sally
Sarah Harmer – singer-songwriter
Frank Ll. Harrison – musicologist
Steven Heighton – author
Elena Juatco – singer and Canadian Idol season 2 top 10 contestant
Irene Luxbacher  – artist, author and illustrator
Cyndra MacDowall – artist and photographer
Emily Julian McManus (M.A., 1894) — poet, author, and educator
Jay Malinowski (B.A. 2004) – vocalist and guitarist for the Canadian band Bedouin Soundclash
Paul Nicholas Mason – author
Michael Ondaatje (M.A. 1967) – author
Neil Pasricha – speaker, author and writer of 1000 Awesome Things
Joseph Petric – musician
Ciara Phillips (BFA 2000) – artist
Maynard Plant – vocalist and guitarist for the Japanese band Monkey Majik
Jean Mills – children's author
Alexander Muir (B.A. 1851) – composer of The Maple Leaf Forever
Baņuta Rubess (B.A., honours 1977) – playwright and theatre director
Eon Sinclair (B.A. 2004) – bassist for Canadian band Bedouin Soundclash
Gord Sinclair – bassist of The Tragically Hip
Russell Smith – author and The Globe and Mail columnist
Moez Surani – author
Timothy Taylor – author
Judith Thompson – playwright
Chris Turner – author

Military
Mark Norman (Bachelor of Economics) – Vice-Admiral, Commander of RCN
John Weir Foote (B.A. 1933) – awarded the Victoria Cross for service during the Dieppe Raid in World War II
Ken Watkin (Bachelor of Laws and Master of Laws) – Brigadier General and Judge Advocate General of the Canadian Forces

Miscellaneous
J. Sidney Bernstein (B.A. 1898) – American lawyer, politician, and judge
Jock Climie (B.A. 1989, LL.B. 1998) – lawyer, former CFL player, and broadcaster
Ferg Devins (B.A. 1984) – Past President Queen's Alumni Association, former Chief Corporate Affairs Officer Molson Coors Canada, Volunteer Chair of Bladder Cancer Canada
J. Douglas Cunningham (B.A., LL.B.) – lawyer and Ontario Superior Court Justice
Julie Dickson (M.E.) – civil servant
David A. Dodge (B.A.) – former Bank of Canada governor and current Chancellor of Queen's University
Virginia Douglas – past president of the Canadian Psychological Association
Andrew J. Feustel (Ph.D) – geophysicist and NASA astronaut
barbara findlay (M.A, LL.B.) – lawyer and LGBT rights activist 
Alan B. Gold – former Chief Justice of Quebec Superior Court; Chancellor of Concordia University
Karla Homolka – convicted murderer, who completed her Queen's Psychology degree while behind bars
Andrew Kalotay (B.Sc. 1964, M.Sc. 1966) – mathematician, Wall Street financier and chess master
Martin Kreuzer (post-doc. 1991) – mathematician, professor, and correspondence chess Grandmaster
James Macleod – militia officer, lawyer, North-West Mounted Police officer, magistrate, judge, and politician.
Andrew McFadyen – patients rights advocate
Kim Phuc (honorary degree recipient) – notable through the picture of her depicted during the Vietnam War
Jack Pickup – physician, the "Flying Doctor of British Columbia"
David Smart (B.A. 1994) – Canadian champion basketball coach
Prince Takamado of Japan
Ali Velshi – CNN business analyst

Political leaders
William Aberhart – former Premier of Alberta
Rohit Aggarwala – Commissioner of the New York City Department of Environmental Protection
Isabel Bassett – former broadcaster and provincial cabinet minister
John Baird (B.A. 1992) – former Minister of the Environment and former Foreign Affairs Minister
Michael Breaugh – former Member of Parliament and Member of Provincial Parliament
Derek Burney (B.A. 1962, M.A. 1964) – former Canadian ambassador to the Korea, Japan, and the United States
Diana Buttu – Palestinian legal advisor
Sean Conway – director of the Institute of Intergovernmental Relations (Queen's University), former Ontario cabinet minister and MPP
Thomas Cromwell (B.Mus. 1973, Law 1976) – Supreme Court justice
John Crosbie – former Minister of Finance
Paul Dewar – educator, aid worker and former Member of Parliament
David Emerson (PhD 1975) – Minister of International Trade and Minister for the Pacific Gateway and the Vancouver-Whistler Olympics
Jean-Denis Garon (Ph.D. 2012) – Scholar and politician, Member of Parliament for Mirabel
John Gerretsen – Ontario MPP, former mayor of Kingston, Ontario cabinet minister
Sir Kenneth O. Hall – Governor General of Jamaica
James R.M. Harris – author and politician, former Leader of the Green Party of Canada
Yolande James (LL.B. 2003) – lawyer and politician, Quebec's first black cabinet minister
Pauline Jewett – university administrator and federal Member of Parliament
David Lloyd Johnston (LL.B. 1966) – president of the University of Waterloo, Principal of McGill University, Dean of the School of Law at the University of Western Ontario, and the 28th Governor General of Canada.
Donald C. MacDonald – former Ontario MPP and leader of the Ontario CCF/NDP (1953–1970)
Nicolas Marceau (Ph.D. 1992) – scholar and politician, former member of Quebec National Assembly and Quebec minister of finance (2012-2014)
John Matheson – "Midwife of Canadian Flag" and former MP for Leeds, judge in Ottawa-Carlton
Frank McKenna – former Canadian ambassador to the United States and former Premier of New Brunswick
Peter Milliken (B.A. 1968) – Speaker of the House of Commons
Tim Murphy – chief of staff of the Canadian Prime Minister's Office under Paul Martin's government
Robert Fowler – (Canadian Diplomat)
Robert Nicholson (B.A. 1975) – Minister of National Defence of Canada
Alison Redford – (attended for two years 1983–1985) 14th premier of Alberta (2011–2014)
George Spotton (B.A. 1895) – member of the House of Commons
Karen Stintz – Toronto municipal councillor and chair of the TTC (2010–2014)
Ross Thatcher – 9th premier of Saskatchewan (1964–1971)
Kathleen Wynne (B.A.) – 25th premier of Ontario (2013–2018)
Rathika Sitsabaiesan (M.I.R. 2007) – Member of Parliament for Scarborough-Rouge River (2011–2015)

Scientists
Walter A. Bell B.Sc. – geologist and paleontologist
Norman L. Bowen B.Sc., M.Sc. – chemical geologist
Leon Katz, B.Sc. MSc. – professor University of Saskatchewan, founder of Saskatchewan Accelerator Laboratory, Member of the Order of Canada
Bill Buxton B.Mus. (1973) – computer scientist and human-computer interaction pioneer
Barbara Cade-Menun – research scientist
Charles LeGeyt Fortescue – electrical engineer
James Edwin Hawley (BSc 1918, MSc 1920) – Head of Geological Sciences Department (1929–1962), Hawleyite is named after him
Kenneth E. Iverson (BSc 1951) – inventor of the APL programming language, Turing Award laureate
Mustapha Ishak Boushaki (PhD 2002) – theoretical physicist
Erin Johnson (PhD 2008) – theoretical chemist
Thomas Edvard Krogh M.Sc.(Geology) – geochronologist and a curator for the Royal Ontario Museum.
Harriet MacMillan (M.D., 1982)  – medical academic and scientist
Margaret McKellar M.D. (1890), medical missionary
J. F. A. McManus M.D. (1938) – pathologist
Derek Muller (BSc 2004) – physics educator, creator and writer-host of Veritasium (YouTube channel)
Anthony J. Naldrett – University of Toronto emeritus professor, geologist 
Kathleen I. Pritchard MD 1971 – head of oncology at Sunnybrook Health Sciences Centre, Toronto
Ian Rae B.Sc. (Eng.) (1980) – co-developer of CorelDraw software
Jane Stewart (B.A. 1956) – neuroscientist
Carolyn Relf (BSc 1984, PhD 1992) – geologist
Harold Horton Sheldon (1893–1964) – physicist, scientist, inventor, teacher, editor and author
Venkatesh K. R. Kodur Ph.D. – University Distinguished Professor at Michigan State University and pioneer in structural fire engineering
Adolfo J. de Bold – O.C. Ph.D. – emeritus professor at University of Ottawa discovered heart hormones

Sports
Keith Eaman – Canadian football player
Johnny Evans – quarterback, two time Grey Cup champion
Dalton Kellett – IndyCar Series Racer
Craig MacTavish (EMBA 2011) – former NHL player, head coach, and hockey operations executive
Morris Mott – NHL and Canadian National Team hockey player
Gordon Orlikow (b. 1960) - decathlon, heptathlon, and hurdles competitor, Athletics Canada Chairman, Canadian Olympic Committee member, Korn/Ferry International partner
George Richardson – Hockey Hall of Fame member, died in World War I
Mike Schad – former NFL player
Carl Voss – NHL player and Hockey Hall of Fame inductee
Jim Young – 1st Canadian college football player drafted into the NFL (Minnesota Vikings)

Notable faculty and affiliates
In addition to the following notable faculty members, Sir Sandford Fleming, former Prime Minister of Canada Sir Robert Laird Borden, and former governor general of Canada Roland Michener have all served as chancellor of the university, though this is a non-academic role.

Donald Akenson – History
Ralph Allen – Art
W. B. Anderson – classics and Latin
István Anhalt – Music (Juno Award winning composer)
Robin Boadway – Economics (Member of the Canadian Royal Society, the Order of Canada and CESIfo Distinguished Fellow)
Caroline Baillie – Engineering
John W. Berry – Psychology
Janine Brodie – Political science
Rosa Bruno-Jofré – History
John Burge – Music, (Juno Award winning composer)
Meredith Chivers – Psychology
James Cordy – Computing (ACM Distinguished Scientist and co-inventor of the Turing programming language)
Thomas Courchene – Economics, Policy studies
Wendy Craig – Psychology
Anne Croy – Canada Research Chair, Biomedical and molecular sciences
Lola Cuddy – Psychology
Richard J. F. Day – Sociology
Vibert Douglas – Astrophysics
Jacalyn Duffin – Medical history
Gabor Fichtinger – Computing (Canada Research Chair, Computer-Integrated Surgery)
Suzanne Fortier – Chemistry (President of the Natural Sciences and Engineering Research Council (NSERC))
Elizabeth Goodyear-Grant – Politics
J. A. W. Gunn – Politics
Tom Kent – Economics
James Allen Keast – Biology (ornithologist)
Audrey Kobayashi – Geography
Will Kymlicka – Canada Research Chair, Philosophy
Susan Lederman – Psychology
William Lederman – Law
William C. Leggett – Biology (Chairman of the Board of the Canada Foundation for Innovation) and former Principal of Queen's University (1994–2004)
A. H. Lightstone – Mathematics
James G. MacKinnon – Economics (Fellow of the Econometric Society)
Art McDonald – Physics (winner of the Herzberg Prize, the Benjamin Franklin Prize in physics, the Nobel Prize in physics and a member of the Order of Canada)
John McGarry – Politics
Katherine McKittrick – Gender studies
Marjan Mozetich – Music
M. Ram Murty – Mathematics (Queen's Research Chair)
Kim Richard Nossal – Politics
Vernon Quinsey – Psychology
Kim Renders – Theatre, Gender studies
Paulo Ribenboim – Mathematics 
Kai Salomaa – Computer science
Bernice Weldon Sargent – Physics
Sanjay Sharma – Medicine (ophthalmology, epidemiology)
Elizabeth Smith Shortt – Medicine
Ana Siljak – History
Duncan G. Sinclair – Medicine
John P. Smol – Biology (winner of the Herzberg Prize)
L. S. Stavrianos – History
Alastair M. Taylor – Geography, Political studies
David J. Thomson – Mathematics
Helen Tiffin – English
Jennie Kidd Trout – Medicine
Craig Walker – Drama
Beatrice Worsley - Computer Scinece, launched Queen's new Computer Centre based on an IBM 1620 in 1965
Noriko Yui – Mathematical Physics
Clarke Mackey – Film and Media
Malcolm Peat – Physiotherapy
Gerald Bull – long-range artillery engineer

Principals
 Rev Thomas Liddell (1841–1846) 
 Rev John Machar (1846–1853) 
 Rev James George (acting Principal 1853–1857) 
 Rev John Cook (1857–1859) 
 Rev William Leitch (1859–1864) 
 Rev William Snodgrass (1864–1877) 
 Rev George Monro Grant (1877–1902) 
 Rev Daniel Miner Gordon (1902–1916) 
 Rev Robert Bruce Taylor (1917–1929) 
 Sir William Hamilton Fyfe (1930–1936) 
 Robert Charles Wallace (1936–1951) 
 William Archibald Mackintosh (1951–1961) 
 James Alexander Corry (1961–1968) 
 John James Deutsch (1968–1974) 
 Ronald Lampman Watts (1974–1984) 
 David Chadwick Smith (1984–1994) 
 William Claude Leggett (1994–2004) 
 Karen R. Hitchcock (2004–2008) 
 Thomas R. Williams (2008–2009) 
 Daniel Woolf (2009–2019) 
Patrick Deane (2019–Present)

Chancellors
 Rev John Cook (1877–1879) 
 Sir Sandford Fleming (1880–1915) 
 James Douglas (1915–1918) 
 Sir Edward Beatty (1918–1923) 
 Sir Robert Laird Borden (1924–1929) 
 James Armstrong Richardson (1929–1939) 
 Charles Avery Dunning (1940–1958) 
 John Bertram Stirling (1960–1973) 
 Roland Michener (1973–1980) 
 Agnes Mccausland Benidickson (1980–1996) 
 Peter Lougheed (1996–2002) 
 A. Charles Baillie (2002–2008) 
 David A. Dodge (2008–2014) 
 Jim Leech (2014–2021) 
 Murray Sinclair (2021–present)

Rectors
 Rev S. W. Dyde (1913)
 James L. Robertson (1916)
 Brigadier General A. E. Ross (1920)
 William H. Coverdale (1925)
 Oscar D. Skelton (1929)
 R. B. Bennett (1935)
 Norman McLeod Rogers (1937)
 The Earl of Athlone (1940)
 BK Sandwell (1944)
 Leonard W. Brockington (1947)
 M. Grattan O'Leary (1968)
 Richard Alan Broadbent (1969, first student Rector)
 Gary Michael Gannage (1972)
 Bruce W. Trotter (1974)
 Morris Chochla (1976)
 Hugh Christie (1978)
 Jeremy Freedman (1980)
 James Harris (1982)
 Richard Powers (1984)
 Kelley McKinnon (1986)
 Charis Kelso (1988)
 Antoinette Mongillo (1990)
 David Baar (1992)
 Peter Gallant (1994)
 Ian Michael (1996)
 Michael Kealy (1998)
 Daniel Sahl (2000)
 Ahmed "KC" Kayssi (2002)
 Grant R.A. Bishop (2004)
 Johsa Marie G. Manzanilla (2006)
 Leora Jackson (2008)
 Nick Day (2010)
 Nick Francis (2011)
 Mike Young (2014)
 Cameron Yung (2016)
 Alexandra da Silva (2018)
 Sam Hiemstra (2020)
 Owen Crawford Lem (2022)

References

Queen's
Queen's University